Child Rights and You America Inc. (formerly Child Relief and You) is an independent, non-religious, non-political, 501(c)(3) registered non-profit organization in the United States. It works to restore basic rights to underprivileged children, especially from India. It is affiliated with Child Rights and You, a non-profit organization in India. CRY focuses mainly on four basic rights which were defined by the United Nations Convention on the Rights of the Child (CRC), an international human rights treaty. The treaty has been ratified by 192 countries, including India.
                                                      
The CRC is built on certain foundation principles that underpin all children's rights. The CRC confers without discrimination the following basic rights on all children across the world:
 The right to health, nutrition, and name and nationality
 The right to develop through education, care, leisure, and recreation
 The right to be protected from exploitation, abuse, or neglect
 The right to express thoughts, receive and give information, and practice religion

CRY America works to ensure these rights to all underprivileged children, who could be street children, children bonded in labor, children of commercial sex workers, physically and mentally challenged children, or children in juvenile institutions.

The San Francisco Bay Area Action Center and the Connecticut Action Center are just two representative centers out of many CRY America action centers throughout United States.

The Bay Area Action Center raises funds and awareness through events, such as, CRY Walk 2007, Dhamaka - a musical song and dance event and the Holiday Donation Drive 2007.

The Connecticut Action Center raises funds and awareness through events, such as, the upcoming event, "INDIAN OCEAN" Concert 2008.

The Detroit Action Center is actively involved in fund raising and local community challenges prevail in Detroit area.

Projects
CRY America's role is not limited to funding. Drawing on the management services of CRY, their partner in India, CRY America attempts to ensure optimal utilization of funds for the enhancement and quality of the supported initiative.

Children's charities based in the United States
Charities based in Massachusetts
India-focused charities